The 1936–37 Detroit Red Wings season was the 11th season for the Detroit franchise in the National Hockey League (NHL) and the fifth operating as the Red Wings. In their 10th season under head coach Jack Adams, the Red Wings compiled a 25–14–9 record, the Red Wings finished first in the American Division and won the Stanley Cup championship. The Wings scored 128 goals, the most in the NHL, and gave up 102 goals by opponents.  The team played its home games at Olympia Stadium in Detroit.

In the Stanley Cup semifinals, the Wings defeated the Montreal Canadiens, three games to two. In the 1937 Stanley Cup Finals, the Wings defeated the New York Rangers, three games to two.  It was the Red Wings' second consecutive Stanley Cup championship.

Although Defenceman Doug Young was originally the team captain, Herbie Lewis, arguably the team's best player, was eventually chosen as Team Captain, and led the Red Wings down the stretch to their second Stanley Cup in as many years. The team's statistical leaders included Larry Aurie with 23 goals, Marty Barry and 27 assists and 44 points scored, and Ebbie Goodfellow with 43 penalty minutes. Aurie's 23 goals tied for the most in the NHL during the 1936-37 season, and Barry's 27 assists were second most in the league. Normie Smith was the team's goaltender in all 48 games. Smith's 25 wins as goaltender led the NHL during the 1936-37 season, and his 2,980 minutes in goal were the second most in the league.

Four members of the team have been inducted into the Hockey Hall of Fame: Ebbie Goodfellow (inducted in 1963); Syd Howe (inducted 1965); Marty Barry (inducted 1965); and Herbie Lewis (inducted 1989).

Offseason

Regular season

Final standings

Record vs. opponents

Schedule and results

Playoffs

Playoffs

(C1) Montreal Canadiens vs. (A1) Detroit Red Wings

Detroit wins best-of-five series 3–2.

(A1) Detroit Red Wings vs. (A3) New York Rangers

Detroit wins the Stanley Cup 3–2.

Player statistics

Regular season
Scoring

Goaltending

Playoffs
Scoring

Goaltending

 *Doug Young was the Captain, but spent most of the injured. Ebbie Goodfellow served as Captain in his place.
 **Orville "Rolly" Roulston also missed most of the season injured.

Note: Pos = Position; GP = Games played; G = Goals; A = Assists; Pts = Points; PIM = Penalty minutes; PPG = Power-play goals; SHG = Short-handed goals; GWG = Game-winning goals
      MIN = Minutes played; W = Wins; L = Losses; T = Ties; GA = Goals-against; GAA = Goals-against average; SO = Shutouts;

Awards and records

Transactions

See also
1936–37 NHL season

References
Red Wings on Hockey Database

Bibliography
 

Detroit Red Wings seasons
Detroit
Detroit
Stanley Cup championship seasons
Detroit Red Wings
Detroit Red Wings